The 2004–05 Swedish Figure Skating Championships were held in Nyköping from December 8 through 12, 2004. Because they were held in December, they were officially designated by the Swedish federation as the 2004 Swedish Championships, but the champions are the 2005 Swedish Champions. Skaters competed in the disciplines of men's and ladies' singles with the results part of the selection criteria for the 2005 World Championships, the 2005 European Championships, and the 2005 World Junior Championships.

Senior results

Men

Ladies

External links
 results

2004 in figure skating
2005 in figure skating
Swedish Figure Skating Championships
Figure Skating Championships
Figure Skating Championships
Sports competitions in Nyköping